Los Tiempos is a newspaper published in Cochabamba, Bolivia. By 2013, its circulation reached 45,000 copies.

Since October 2017, the newspaper is published in Berliner. Prior to this, the newspaper was a broadsheet.

History
Los Tiempos was founded on 16 September 1943 by Demetrio Canelas, who had already founded the newspaper La Patria in Oruro in 1919. He was assaulted and practically destroyed by a mob of militants of the Revolutionary Nationalist Movement on 9 November 1953, resuming its publications on 19 July 1967 with the premiere of a rotary offset.

On 17 September 1989, it inaugurated its modern building, and on 4 September 1996, it opened its website.

References

External links
 Official website

1943 establishments in Bolivia
Newspapers published in Bolivia
Mass media in Cochabamba
Newspapers established in 1943